Tabakadhonnihalli is a village in Dharwad district of Karnataka, India.

Demographics 
As of the 2011 Census of India there were 835 households in Tabakadhonnihalli and a total population of 4,170 consisting of 2,174 males and 1,996 females. There were 586 children ages 0-6.

References

Villages in Dharwad district